"När vi gräver guld i USA" ("When We Dig for Gold in the USA") was a song which was used as fight song for the Swedish national team during the 1994 FIFA World Cup in the United States, where Sweden ended up third. During the Grammis Awards for 1994, it won the category "Song of the year 1994".

The song was written and recorded by Swedish pop trio Glenmark Eriksson Strömstedt. The words När vi gräver guld i USA (When we dig gold in the USA), which appear in the chorus, refer to both 19th century gold rushes in the USA, as well as to the gold medals awarded for the FIFA World Cup winner.

Staying at the Swedish singles chart for totally 40 weeks, the single  topped the chart.

The song also charted at Svensktoppen for nine weeks between 18 June and 13 August 1994, peaking at second position.

The song lyrics "Flickorna har blommor i sitt hår, där står alla pojkarna på rad, tillsammans är vi oslagbara!" contain references to three other songs by the writers. The songs are Anders Glenmark's "Hon har blommor i sitt hår", Orup's "Då står pojkarna på rad" and Niklas Strömstedt's "Oslagbara".

2014 revival
In October 2014, the song was performed during Så mycket bättre in season 5 of the Swedish musical series. During "Orup Dag" ("Orup Day") when the participants were to pick songs from Orup to perform, Amanda Jenssen chose "När vi gräver guld i USA" reinterpreting the English version as "When We Dig for Gold in the USA". Her interpretation was a toned down much slower version as compared to the original hectic version meant as a rally of support for the Swedish National Football Team.

Her interpretation became very popular with the public. The release of the new version as downloads resulted in the single reaching number 4 on the Swedish Singles Chart.

Charts

Glenmark Eriksson Strömstedt version

Amanda Jenssen version

References

External links 

 

1994 songs
1994 singles
Swedish-language songs
Football songs and chants
Sweden national football team songs
1994 FIFA World Cup
Songs written by Anders Glenmark
Songs written by Orup
Songs written by Niklas Strömstedt
Glenmark Eriksson Strömstedt songs
Amanda Jenssen songs
1994 in Swedish football
Songs about the United States